Alexander Nigel Ainley (born 16 July 1981) is a former New Zealand rugby union player who played as a lock for  in the Bunnings NPC and the  in Super Rugby.

Senior career

Ainley started out his rugby career in 2006 playing for the newly formed  Mako in the ITM Cup and played all 10 of their games during their debut season, featuring exclusively as a flanker.   He went on to captain the Mako in 2007 before handing it over to Andrew Goodman the following season.

From 2007 to 2009, Ainley spent his off seasons playing in Europe for Crociati in Parma.  2009 was to be his final campaign in his first spell with Tasman as he headed overseas to take up a contract with Japanese side, the Mitsubishi Dynaboars. He spent 3 seasons playing in the Japanese second division before heading home to New Zealand again in 2013. He was immediately named in the Mako squad for the 2013 ITM Cup and featured in 10 matches as they won promotion to the Premiership.

Tasman continued their good form through 2015 and 2016, finishing as losing semi- finalists and runner up respectively.

Ainley returned to the Tasman Mako for the 2020 Mitre 10 Cup and in Round 9 against  Ainley played his 100th game for the Mako at Lansdowne Park in Blenheim, becoming only the second centurion in the short history of the union. The Mako went on to win their second premiership title in a row.

Super Rugby
Ainley was rewarded for years of hard work and toil when at the age of 33 he was handed his first Super Rugby contract by the Dunedin based  ahead of the 2015 Super Rugby season. He endured a tough start to his spell with the Highlanders, finding himself as the fourth choice lock for the franchise behind the more established Joe Wheeler, Mark Reddish and Tom Franklin and also broke his jaw playing club rugby early into the season. He went on to start 8 games during a historic year which finished with the Highlanders lifting the Super Rugby trophy for the first time in their history, defeating the  21-14 in the final.

Tony Brown replaced the Japan bound Jamie Joseph ahead of the 2017 season and he retained the 35 year old Ainley in the squad for his first campaign in charge.

Career Honours

Tasman

ITM Cup Championship - 2013
Mitre 10 Cup - 2020

Highlanders

Super Rugby - 2015

Bay of Plenty
Mitre 10 Cup Championship - 2019

References

1981 births
Living people
New Zealand rugby union players
Rugby union locks
Tasman rugby union players
Mitsubishi Sagamihara DynaBoars players
Highlanders (rugby union) players
Bay of Plenty rugby union players
Rugby union players from Auckland